Guillaume Grand, born in 1983 in Bergerac, is a French singer and composer. He is best known for his song  "Toi et Moi" ("You and Me") from his debut album L'amour est laid.

Discography

Albums

Singles

References

External links
 Official website

1983 births
Living people
People from Bergerac, Dordogne
French singer-songwriters
21st-century French singers